AKOM Production, Ltd. (Animation KOrea Movie 애이콤 프로덕션) is a South Korean animation studio in Songpa-gu, Seoul that has provided much work since its conception in 1985 by Nelson Shin. Its biggest claim to fame is the overseas animation of more than 200 episodes of The Simpsons, a total which continues to increase. In 2007, the studio produced a portion of the overseas animation for The Simpsons Movie.

The studio also worked on various US and foreign series.

Other well-known series that AKOM has been involved in including X-Men, The Tick, Tiny Toon Adventures, Animaniacs, Batman: The Animated Series, The Transformers, the first 11 seasons of PBS's Arthur, and six of The Land Before Time films.

As of 2023, the studio stopped animating cartoons nor producing episodes for years.

Animation production

Animaniacs (Seasons 1–4 and Back In Style)
Arthur (Seasons 1–11)
Attack of the Killer Tomatoes: The Animated Series (first season only)
A Bunch of Munsch
Batman: The Animated Series (1992–1993) - 13 half-hour episodes: "Christmas with the Joker", "The Last Laugh", "Be a Clown", "The Cat and the Claw: Part 2", "Prophecy of Doom", "Feat of Clay: Part 1", "Mad as a Hatter", "Cat Scratch Fever", "The Strange Secret of Bruce Wayne", "Joker's Wild", "Moon of the Wolf", "What Is Reality?" and "The Mechanic". (AKOM was eventually fired due to its inconsistent animation in many episodes such as "Cat Scratch Fever" and "Moon of the Wolf".) 
Bucky O'Hare and the Toad Wars
C Bear and Jamal
Conan the Adventurer (first season only)
Crash Bandicoot (cancelled advertisement and cutscene)
Defenders of the Earth
Dilbert
Dino Riders (episodes 3–13)
Dooly the Little Dinosaur
Dr. Rabbit's World Tour (educational film)
Dragon Flyz
Earthworm Jim
Exosquad
Fraggle Rock: The Animated Series
G.I. Joe Extreme (Season 1)
Garfield: A Tail of Two Kitties (Opening Titles)
Gargoyles
Huntik: Secrets & Seekers
Invasion America
Jackie Bison Show
Jem
Jim Henson's Muppet Babies (Seasons 4-8)
Kelly's Dream Club
The Land Before Time (Films II–VI)
Little Clowns of Happytown
The Little Lulu Show
Little Wizards
The Longest Daycare - A Simpsons theatrical short
Marsupilami
McGee and Me!
Mission Hill
Mosaic (Opening Titles)
My Little Pony
My Little Pony Tales
My Little Pony: The Movie (with Toei Animation)
The Oblongs
Peter Pan and the Pirates
Pinky and the Brain
Problem Child
The Real Ghostbusters ("Slimer Come Home", "When Halloween was Forever", "Station Identification", "Fright at the Opera")
Red Planet (uncredited)
Rescue Heroes
Road Rovers
Robocop: The Animated Series
Rude Dog and the Dweebs
Savage Dragon
Sesame Street ("Monster in the Mirror" celebrity version only, Simpsons cameo)
Sgt. Savage and his Screaming Eagles
Silver Surfer
The Simpsons, ( movie, and the video game's animated cutscenes)
Skeleton Warriors
Spiral Zone (15 Episodes)
The Spooktacular New Adventures of Casper
Taz-Mania
Teenage Mutant Ninja Turtles ("Grybyx", uncredited)
The Tick
Tiny Toon Adventures (1990–1992) - 24 half-hour episodes: Cinemaniacs!, Furrball Follies, Life in the 90's, Stuff That Goes Bump in the Night, The Wacko World of Sports, Sawdust and Toonsil, A Quack in the Quarks, Animaniacs!, Psychic Fun-Omenom Day, Whale's Tales, Weirdest Story Ever Told, The Acme Home Shopping Show, Playtime Toons, Pledge Week, Elephant Issues, Toon Physics, Hog-Wild Hamton, A Cat's Eye View, Toons from the Crypt, Sports Shorts, Sepulveda Boulevard, Grandma's Dead, Fox Trot and Washingtoon.
Toad Patrol
The Transformers (3 episodes of Season 2, 14 episodes of Season 3, all of Season 4)
Ultimate Book of Spells
Wheel Squad
Wunschpunsch
X-Men (Seasons 1–5, except for the final six episodes and the 'Out of the Past' two-parter, and an early broadcast version of "No Mutant Is An Island")

References

External links

 co-productions database

South Korean animation studios
Entertainment companies of South Korea
Mass media companies established in 1985
South Korean companies established in 1985